Orlando Bush (December 25, 1849 – April 29, 1925) was a farmer, businessman and political figure in Ontario and Alberta. He represented Grenville in the Legislative Assembly of Ontario as a Conservative member from 1890 to 1898.

He was born in Oxford Township, Grenville County, Canada West in 1849, the son of Henry Bush (1807-1894) and his wife Maria Stanley and a grandson of a United Empire Loyalist, ( and was educated in the local schools. In 1882, he married Ellen Mundle. He was a member of the township council for Oxford, serving as township reeve from 1886 to 1889 and warden for Leeds and Grenville Counties in 1888.

Bush lived near Kemptville, where he sold produce and owned several cheese factories, until 1898 when he moved to Alberta. He farmed and ranched in Clover Bar district east of Strathcona. In 1903, he established a real estate, insurance and loan agency at Strathcona. Bush ran unsuccessfully for a seat in the House of Commons in 1904. He served on the Strathcona city council from 1908 to 1910 and was also a member of the local school board. In 1908, he married Henryetta Bower after the death of his first wife. Bush retired from farming in 1910 and from business in 1911. He served on Edmonton City Council in 1915 and 1917 after Strathcona amalgamated with Edmonton.

He was a member of the Freemasons, the Ancient Order of United Workmen and the Loyal Orange Lodge.

References

External links 
The Canadian parliamentary companion, 1891 JA Gemmill

History of the province of Alberta. Vol. 2, AO MacRae (1912)
Edmonton Public Library - Biographies of Mayors and Councillors

1849 births
1925 deaths
Edmonton city councillors
Progressive Conservative Party of Ontario MPPs